Lloyd Arthur "Dutch" Dietz (February 12, 1912 – October 29, 1972) was a major-league (MLB) pitcher from 1940 to 1943. He began his MLB career with the Pittsburgh Pirates and was traded to the Philadelphia Phillies in his final season.

References

External links

1912 births
1972 deaths
Major League Baseball pitchers
Pittsburgh Pirates players
Philadelphia Phillies players
Baseball players from Ohio
Western Michigan Broncos baseball players